Anna Lacková-Zora (born Anna Domková; 7 August 1899 – 8 September 1988) was a Slovak author. She published under the pseudonyms of Zora-Lacková, aunt Zora, Zora and Lacková-Zora. She was born in Mosóc (present-day Mošovce). At first she worked as a bank clerk, but then fully devoted herself to her literary work, which she began during World War I.

After her first collection of poems she wrote novellas and novels on topics concerning women. In her historical prose Lacková-Zora captured the movement around Ľudovít Štúr in Slovak and in an interslavic context. She died in Myjava.

Gallery

References

Slovak novelists
1899 births
1988 deaths
Mošovce
20th-century Slovak women writers
20th-century Slovak writers
Slovak poets
People from Turčianske Teplice District